Operational Fires (abbreviated as OpFires) is a hypersonic ground-launched system developed by DARPA for the United States Armed Forces. The system deploys a boost glide vehicle. The prime contractor for the program is Lockheed Martin. Range is thought to be up to 1,000 miles (1,609 kilometers).

OpFires intends to produce a medium-range hypersonic missile that is cheaper and with less range than the Long-Range Hypersonic Weapon (LRHW) to strike larger numbers of targets at operational ranges. It will reuse the glide body from the AGM-183 ARRW. The unique aspect of OpFires is use of a "throttleable" rocket motor, where thrust can be turned off at a desired point mid-flight instead of needing to wait until all fuel is burned to make it better able to hit a short-range target.

The system was successfully tested in July 2022 from a Palletized Load System-based launcher vehicle at White Sands Missile Range.

See also 
Pershing II (similar range)
Long-Range Hypersonic Weapon
AGM-183 ARRW
Hypersonic Air-breathing Weapon Concept

References 

Military research of the United States
Medium-range ballistic missiles of the United States
DARPA
Lockheed Martin